Château-l'Abbaye is a commune of the Nord department in northern France.

Heraldry

See also
Communes of the Nord department

References

Chateaulabbaye